Luisana Pérez (born 24 August 1976) is a Venezuelan table tennis player. She competed at the 2000 Summer Olympics and the 2004 Summer Olympics.

References

External links
 

1976 births
Living people
Venezuelan female table tennis players
Olympic table tennis players of Venezuela
Table tennis players at the 2000 Summer Olympics
Table tennis players at the 2004 Summer Olympics
Sportspeople from Caracas
Pan American Games medalists in table tennis
Pan American Games silver medalists for Venezuela
Pan American Games bronze medalists for Venezuela
Table tennis players at the 2003 Pan American Games
Table tennis players at the 2011 Pan American Games
Medalists at the 2003 Pan American Games
Medalists at the 2011 Pan American Games
20th-century Venezuelan women
21st-century Venezuelan women